Matija Kluković (born 4 May 1982 in Zagreb, Croatia) is a young Croatian independent film director. In 2006 he finished his debut feature Slow Days (Ajde, dan... prođi...) that has received much critical acclaim from Croatian film critics, won Golden Pram award at Zagreb Film Festival and internationally premiered at Rotterdam. In 2008, Slow Days placed 15th in the list of the best Croatian films since 1990, compiled by Jutarnji list.

Filmography

As director
2006 Slow Days (Original title Ajde, dan... prođi...)
2009 Film Gorana Odvorčića i Matije Klukovića za Asju Jovanović i Andreu Rumenjak (Zagrebačke priče)

As writer
2006 Slow Days (Original title Ajde, dan... prođi...)
2009 Film Gorana Odvorčića i Matije Klukovića za Asju Jovanović i Andreu Rumenjak (Zagrebačke priče)
2009 Ciao mama

As actor
2006 Slow Days (Original title Ajde, dan... prođi...)

References

External links

1982 births
Croatian film directors
Living people